Dewey Martin (born Walter Milton Dwayne Midkiff, September 30, 1940 – January 31, 2009) was a Canadian rock drummer, best known for his work with Buffalo Springfield, for which he was inducted into the Rock and Roll Hall of Fame in 1997.

Career
Dewey Martin was born in Chesterville, Ontario, Canada in 1940. He was raised there and in the surrounding Smiths Falls, Ontario and Ottawa, Ontario areas.  In Ottawa, he attended Glebe Collegiate Institute, where he was elected "head boy".

Martin started playing drums when he was about 13 years old. His first band was a high school outfit, The Jive Rockets, which also featured guitarist Vern Craig, later a member of the Staccatos. He soon progressed and played with various dance and rockabilly groups in the Ottawa Valley area, including Bernie Early & the Early Birds. Through rock and roll singer Andy Wilson, a veteran of the Ottawa-area scene, he was allowed a short guest appearance singing "Whole Lotta Shakin' Going On" backed by Wilson's group, Larry Lee and the Leesures, during the Leesures' appearance as part of a package rock & roll show in Ottawa in the early 1960s. A Nashville producer was sufficiently impressed and agreed to record him in Nashville.

Moves to United States and Nashville
Interrupted by a brief stint in the U.S. Army, Martin's next couple of years were based out of Nashville, where he worked as a freelance (some say itinerant) drummer for many Country music legendary artists including Carl Perkins, The Everly Brothers, Patsy Cline, Charlie Rich, Faron Young and Roy Orbison, among others. In 1963, he travelled to Las Vegas with Faron Young's band and then to Los Angeles, California, where he was later quoted as having said he loved the climate and decided to stay. However, various tours also took him out of town "on the road."

Sir Raleigh & The Coupons
Through Mel Taylor of The Ventures, Martin began working in the Pacific Northwest with  a group called Lucky Lee & The Blue Diamonds. In November 1964, he used some local musicians to record his first single, a cover of "White Cliffs of Dover" backed by the band original, "Somethin' or Other" for A&M Records, which was released under the guise Sir Raleigh & The Coupons.

During 1965 Sir Raleigh & The Coupons released two more singles on A&M – "While I Wait" c/w "Somethin' or Other" and "Tomorrow's Gonna Be Another Day" c/w "Whitcomb Street" and a single for Tower – "Tell Her Tonight" c/w "If You Need Me."

During this period Martin returned to Los Angeles and picked up local group the Sons of Adam to support him as a permanent outfit back in the Northwest. The new line up opened for The Beach Boys and Herman's Hermits during this period.

Martin also recorded a final single for Tower – "I Don't Want to Cry" c/w "Always," which was released in February 1966. In 1980, Picc-A-Dilly/First American label pulled together most of The Sir Raleigh & The Coupons material for the Dewey Martin album, "One Buffalo Heard."

The Standells, MFQ and The Dillards
Back in Los Angeles in late 1965 Martin spent a few months with The Standells when drummer/singer Dick Dodd left. When Dodd returned in February 1966, Martin briefly joined The Modern Folk Quartet before touring and recording a demo with The Dillards. During late March/early April, Martin was working with The Dillards at the Ice House in Pasadena when Doug Dillard told him that his services were no longer needed and gave him a telephone number for a new group that needed a drummer. The band was Buffalo Springfield.

Buffalo Springfield
Martin became the last member to join the legendary group at its founding. Along with Stephen Stills and Richie Furay, he was one of only three musicians to stay with the group from its inception in April 1966 to its disbandment on May 5, 1968. During his time with the group Martin also did session work for The Monkees.

In concert he sang covers of Wilson Pickett's "In The Midnight Hour" and Richie Furay's "Nobody's Fool" and "Good Time Boy." The latter appeared on the band's second album, Buffalo Springfield Again. He also sang Neil Young's "Mr. Soul" as the introduction to Young's "Broken Arrow" on the same album. Martin also sang backing vocals on the band's biggest hit, Stephen Stills's classic political rock anthem "For What It's Worth."

New Buffalo Springfield
When the original band broke up Martin formed a new version in September 1968. Dubbed "New Buffalo Springfield", the lineup comprised guitarists Dave Price (Davy Jones' stand-in in The Monkees) and Gary Rowles (son of jazz pianist Jimmy Rowles); bass player Bob Apperson; drummer Don Poncher; and horn player Jim Price, who later became a top session musician for The Rolling Stones and Joe Cocker among others.

The new band toured extensively and appeared at the highly publicised "Holiday Rock Festival" in San Francisco on December 25–26 but soon ran afoul of Stephen Stills and Neil Young who took legal action to prevent Martin from using the band's name.

In February 1969, Martin and Dave Price formed a second version of New Buffalo Springfield with guitarist Bob "BJ" Jones and bass player Randy Fuller, brother of Bobby Fuller. The band did some tentative recordings with producer Tom Dowd overseeing but they were scrapped. They performed live at the Easter Rock Festival in Fort Lauderdale, FL on April 1 of 1969.

The second line up was expanded with another guitarist Joey Newman in June 1969, but two months later Martin was fired and the remaining members carried on as Blue Mountain Eagle.

Medicine Ball
In September 1969 Martin signed a solo deal with Uni Records and recorded a cover of the country favourite, "Jambalaya" with session ace  and TCB Band member James Burton on guitar. It was released as a single with Martin's own composition "Ala-Bam" on the b-side.

He then briefly worked on some new material with guitarist John Noreen from the folk-rock group, Rose Garden but by December the pair had split.

Martin next put together a new group called Medicine Ball, which featured mainstays, guitarist Billy Darnell and pianist Pete Bradstreet, who later recorded with the band Electric Range. The band also featured at various times, guitarists Bob Stamps and Randy Fuller, and bass players Terry Gregg, Harvey Kagan and Steve Lefever. An album, "Dewey Martin's Medicine Ball", was released in August 1970 and featured steel guitarist Buddy Emmons and former Buffalo Springfield bass player Bruce Palmer.

In late 1970 Martin and Darnell formed a new version of Medicine Ball with pianist Charles Lamont and bass player Tom Leavey and made some tentative recordings which were subsequently scrapped.

Martin then recorded five tracks with the TCB Band for RCA. Two of the songs – a cover of Alan O'Day's "Caress Me Pretty Music" and a cover of Joe Cocker and Chris Stainton's "There Must Be A Reason" were put out as a single in early 1971. In June of that year Martin traveled to Bakersfield, California, where he judged a Battle of the Bands sponsored by a local radio station. There he spotted the Bill Shaw Madness, whose members included, in addition to Shaw (guitar and vocals), Mark Yeary (piano, organ and vocals), Lew Wilcox (bass and vocals), Daddy Ray Arvizu (saxes), and Eric Griffin (drums). That night Martin tapped Madness as his backup band, intending to tour in support of the material he had recorded for RCA. Following several months of rehearsal and two Bakersfield performances, creative differences led to Martin's return to Los Angeles. After producing an album for Truk in late 1971, Martin retired from the music industry to become a car mechanic.  By the mid 1970s he was back in hometown Ottawa, living with his mother and taking an interest in the career of a local group, Maxwell Train.  Together with Toronto-based Bruce Palmer, he sought to introduce the group to US industry contacts, but nothing substantial came of the project - though Martin remained in the US.

Eighties revival and beyond
During the mid-1980s Martin briefly worked with Pink Slip and the Meisner-Roberts Band. In the late 80's while touring with Roberts and Meisner, he decided to stay a few extra nights in San Antonio following a gig for the San Antonio Jaycees to see his buddy, musician Augie Myers. Martin told concert producer/musician Raven Alan St. John he had been robbed by hotel maids at the Sierra Royale Suites and couldn't pay for the extra nights. The hotel comped him for two more nights and fired one maid.

He also played with Buffalo Springfield Revisited, the band formed by original bass player, Bruce Palmer. During the early 1990s Martin revived the mantle under the name "Buffalo Springfield Again" with Bruce Palmer and Joe Dickinson (father of singer Laura Dickinson) for further live work but retired around 1998. Since then he spent time developing his own drum rim.

In 1997 Martin invented and filed a patent application for a drum with a three-part rim that could be used to make three different rimshot sounds. He received patent 5,834,667 on this drum on Nov 10, 1998; the patent was issued to him under his legal name, Walter M.D. Midkiff.
In 1997 Dewey was inducted into The Rock and Roll Hall of Fame along with Buffalo Springfield.

In 2008 Martin joined the cast of Matt Alan's live Internet radio program, OUTLAW RADIO. His unique personality, fascinating stories, and quirky wit soon endeared him to the show's worldwide audience. A special three-hour tribute to "The Great Dewey Martin" was broadcast Saturday, February 9, produced by Matt Alan, and featuring tributes by those who knew and loved him, including record producer John Hill, author Burl Barer, Prescott Niles of The Knack, Micky Dolenz of The Monkees, media legend Shadoe Stevens, and many more. The program is available in the archives at Outlawradiousa.com.

Death
Martin died on January 31, 2009. His body was found the next day by a roommate in his Van Nuys apartment. Longtime friend Lisa Lenes said Martin had health problems in previous years, and she believed he died of natural causes. He was 68.

References

External links
 Dewey Martin on Xtrememusician.com
 NickWarburton.com 

1940 births
2009 deaths
Canadian rock drummers
Canadian male drummers
Buffalo Springfield members
People from the United Counties of Stormont, Dundas and Glengarry
Musicians from Ontario
20th-century American drummers
American male drummers
20th-century Canadian drummers
20th-century American male musicians
The Standells members